The Diamond Peak Formation is a geologic formation in Nevada. It preserves fossils dating back to the Carboniferous period.

See also

 List of fossiliferous stratigraphic units in Nevada
 Paleontology in Nevada

References

Carboniferous geology of Nevada
Carboniferous southern paleotropical deposits